Events from the year 1591 in Ireland.

Incumbent
Monarch: Elizabeth I

Events
February – Brian O'Rourke, rebel lord of West Bréifne, seeks right of asylum in the Kingdom of Scotland.
March 20 – Seamus Ó hÉilidhe is appointed Roman Catholic Archbishop of Tuam.
April 3 – Brian O'Rourke is arrested in Glasgow and delivered to the English.
November 3 – O'Rourke is hanged at Tyburn. His son, Brian Oge O'Rourke, succeeds as lord.
November – Barnabe Riche proposes action against Roman Catholic recusants.
December 26 – Hugh Roe O'Donnell escapes from Dublin Castle but is recaptured within days.
Early 1591–Autumn 1592 – Edmund MacGauran, Roman Catholic Archbishop of Armagh, travels in Spain and Portugal seeking financial and military assistance for an uprising in Ireland.
Hugh Roe MacMahon, The MacMahon, resists the imposition of an English sheriff in County Monaghan; he is charged with treason, for which he will be executed, and his lordship divided.
Hugh O'Neill, Earl of Tyrone, elopes with Mabel, sister of Henry Bagenal, Provincial President of Ulster.

Births
Michael Wadding, Jesuit theologian and missionary priest (d. 1644)

Deaths
Early? – Sir Nicholas Bagenal, marshal of the army in Ireland (b. 1509/10)
November 3 – Brian O'Rourke, lord of West Bréifne (b. 1540?) (hanged)
Tadhg Dall Ó hÚigínn, poet (b. c.1550)

References

 
1590s in Ireland
Ireland